Tabernaemontana brachyantha is a species of plant in the family Apocynaceae. It is found in central Africa.

References

brachyantha